Pierre Charles (30 June 1954 – 6 January 2004) was Prime Minister of Dominica from 2000 to 2004 as well as Member of Parliament for Grand Bay, Dominica, from 1985 until his death.

Biography
Charles was born in Grand Bay in Saint Patrick parish. He began his high-school education at the Dominica Grammar School and completed it at the St. Mary's Academy before pursuing studies at the local teachers' college. He served as a teacher and community organizer before entering elective office.

He became ill in February 2003, and had angioplasty surgery. Concerns about his health led to calls for him to step down. However, he continued to serve as prime minister until his death, which occurred during a medical leave of absence. Osborne Riviere acted as Prime Minister in Charles' stead. However, upon return from his medical leave of absence, Charles succumbed at the age of 49 to a heart attack while being driven home from a Cabinet meeting.

Political ascendancy

In 1979, at the age of 25, Charles was appointed a Senator in Dominica’s Parliament. In the general elections of 1985, he contested the Grand Bay seat, and won, though his Dominica Labour Party (DLP) – led by Rosie Douglas’s brother Michael Douglas – lost to the incumbent Dominica Freedom Party (DFP) under the leadership of the formidable Dame Eugenia Charles (no relation), Dominica's longest serving head of government. For the next 15 years, Pierre Charles remained in that position, as irremovable from Grand Bay as Rosie Douglas was from Portsmouth.

When the DLP (in coalition with the DFP) came to power in 2000 under the leadership of Rosie Douglas, Charles was appointed Minister of Public Works and Communications. During the eight months of Douglas’s rule, Charles was often called upon to function as the acting Prime Minister. When Douglas suddenly died in October 2000, Charles was elevated as Douglas’s successor. He continued in office until his sudden death in January 2004.

Charles was an Honorary Member of The International Raoul Wallenberg Foundation.

References

External links
Dominica PM dies: The Globe and Mail (Canada).

1954 births
2004 deaths
Dominica Labour Party politicians
Finance ministers of Dominica
Foreign ministers of Dominica
Members of the House of Assembly of Dominica
People from Saint Patrick Parish, Dominica
Prime Ministers of Dominica
21st-century Dominica politicians